Decatur Creek is a creek that flows into Schenevus Creek in Worcester, New York. Decatur Creek was formally called Parker Creek.

References

Rivers of New York (state)
Rivers of Otsego County, New York